In the lower part of the helix the cartilage is prolonged downward as a tail-like process, the cauda helicis; this is separated from the antihelix by a fissure, the fissura antitragohelicina.

References 

Ear